Anatolie Doroș (born 21 March 1983) is a Moldovan international footballer who last played as a striker for CS Petrocub.

Career
During the 2012 Azerbaijani winter transfer window, Doroș joined Simurq on a contract till the end of the season, with an option of an extension.

Career statistics

International goals

References

External links
 
 
 
 

Living people
1983 births
Moldovan footballers
Moldova international footballers
Moldovan Super Liga players
Ekstraklasa players
Azerbaijan Premier League players
Ukrainian First League players
Kazakhstan Premier League players
Legia Warsaw players
Polonia Warsaw players
Korona Kielce players
FC Chornomorets Odesa players
Expatriate footballers in Azerbaijan
Expatriate footballers in Poland
FK Standard Sumgayit players
FC Rapid Ghidighici players
People from Florești District
Moldovan expatriates in Poland
Association football forwards
FK MKT Araz players
CS Petrocub Hîncești players
FC Volga Ulyanovsk players